The 1987 Harvard Crimson football team was an American football team that represented Harvard University during the 1987 NCAA Division I-AA football season. Harvard was champion of the Ivy League.

In their 17th year under head coach Joe Restic, the Crimson compiled an 8–2 record and outscored opponents 243 to 163. Kevin J. Dulsky was the team captain.

Harvard's 6–1 conference record was the best in the Ivy League standings. The Crimson outscored Ivy opponents 177 to 84.

The Crimson briefly appeared in the weekly national top 20, achieving No. 20 in the poll released November 3, but fell out of the rankings the next week and remained unranked through the end of the season.

Harvard played its home games at Harvard Stadium in the Allston neighborhood of Boston, Massachusetts.

Schedule

References

Harvard
Harvard Crimson football seasons
Ivy League football champion seasons
Harvard Crimson football
Harvard Crimson football